Scotland's Winter Festival is an annual, nationwide festival that takes place across the winter months of November, December and January. Three particular events are highlighted: Saint Andrew's Day, Hogmanay and Burns night.

Background and Participation 
Winter has always been an important time in the Scottish calendar, encompassing many cultural events and historical traditions, such as Halloween and Beltane - including the three national days of St Andrews Day, Hogmanay and Burns Night. Scotland's Winter Festival works these events into a winter long festival across Scotland. In 2017 the festival encompassed 23 events across 17 local authority areas.

The events included are wide-ranging, from a "festival of lights" at the Scottish Maritime Museum & Harbourside, to a variety of Hogmanay events across Scotland.

References

Annual events in Scotland
Tourist attractions in Scotland
Scottish culture
Festivals in Scotland
Hogmanay
Robert Burns